Raymond de Geouffre de La Pradelle de Leyrat (November 22, 1910 – July 19, 2002) was a French lawyer.

Biography

Family 
De Geouffre de la Pradelle's name comes from a village located in the commune of Rignac in Aveyron. Born to Albert Geouffre de La Pradelle and Thérèse Paul-Toinet, he married Hélène Boudet de Castelli (born 1915) on October 11, 1934. Together, Hélène and Raymond had three children: Géraud, Arnaud, and Marie-Ange. After getting divorced from Castelli, he  married Éliane Puech on June 12, 1972.

Formation 
de Geouffre studied at the Lycée Buffon and at the École Tannenberg in Paris. He became a graduate of the Free School of Political Science in diplomacy, and became secretary of the Italo-Ethiopian Commission. Later, in 1935, a member of the Conference of Lawyers In 1938, he became the organization's secretary general, and in 1951, vice-president. From 1956 to 1960, de Geouffre was a member of the French division of the International Law Association. He acted as the general secretary of the International Juridical Air Committee from 1952 to 1955, and later a member of the France-Egypt Association in 1965.

Career 
Before the Second World War, he defended members of La Cagoule; then, after the war, his uncle Pierre, municipal councilor, lawyer and magistrate, prosecuted for his role as an investigating judge in the Vichy government.

In 1949, while defending German soldiers prosecuted in French courts, he asked Henri Donnedieu de Vabres for clarification on the legal basis of the Nuremberg trials. He then sat, within the Allied High Commission, on the steering committee of the Association for the Safeguarding of French Assets and Interests Abroad (ASBIFE), alongside representatives of firms such as Saint-Gobain, Schlumberger, Société Alsatian company in mechanical construction, the rubber, petroleum, chemical, mechanical and electrical construction, textile and food sectors, including five champagne houses.

On September 27, 1956, he published a guest column on the question of whether or not Egypt had violated international law during the Suez Crisis. In 1959, in Le Monde, he refused any Soviet takeover of the Moon after the moon landing of Luna 2. In 1960, in another guest column, this time in Le Figaro, he argued that  only Germany had jurisdiction to try Adolf Eichmann, and that Israel did not.

He defended Holocaust denier Paul Rassinier,. In 1962, he defended four diplomats: André Mattei, Jean-Paul Bellivier, Henri Mouton, and André Miquel accused of espionage by the government of Gamal Abdel Nasser who were freed after the intervention of Hassan II, the King of Morocco, and Henri, the Count of Paris. On May 26, 1967, he wrote a guest column about the legal status of the Gulf of Aqaba on the eve of the Six-Day War.

In 1978, he defended Fernand Sorlot, accused of having re-published Mein Kampf. He argued in court that Adolf Hitler's book was a historical document, which should, as such, be freely available. 

On October 22, 1981, he defended Paul Touvier, accused of crimes against humanity. He spoke of Touvier's "evasion" of his responsibilities and his "manifest cowardice". In the same year, he defended Jean Bedel Bokassa and spoke about practices  "contrary to his ethical principles", 

On August 10, 1982, Geouffre de La Pradelle wrote a guest column, after the Israeli military intervention in Lebanon in 1982, concerning the case law prohibiting the bombing of buildings and civilian populations.

Books 
La monarchie, Éditions internationales, 1944
L'affaire d'Ascq, Éditions internationales, 1949
Le problème de la Silésie et le droit, Éditions internationales, 1958
Aux frontières de l'injustice, Albin Michel, 1979

Bibliography 
Le sionisme contre Israël, de Nathan Weinstock, 1969
Des hommes libres : histoires extraordinaires de l'histoire, de Jean-Pierre Allali, Haim Musicant, 1986
La monarchie aujourd'hui, de Pierre Pujo, 1988
Bokassa Ier un empereur français, de Stephen Smith, Géraldine Faes, 2000
Dark Age: The Political Odys, de Brian Titley, 2002
Le Théâtre de Satan : décadence du droit, partialité des juges, d'Éric Delcroix, Paris, L'Æncre, 2002.
Les entreprises françaises face à l’Allemagne de 1945 à la fin des années 60, de Jean-François Eck, 2013
Paul Touvier et l'Église: Rapport de la commission, de René Rémond, 2014
Comment l'idée vint à M. Rassinier: Naissance du révisionnisme, de Florent Brayard, 2014
L'Affaire Touvier: Quand les archives s'ouvrent, de Bénédicte Vergez-Chaignon, 2016
Nobility and patrimony in modern France, d'Elizabeth C. Macknight, 2018

References 
 

20th-century French lawyers
1910 births
2002 deaths